The largest projects in the Philippine Economy includes both megaprojects, costing over $1 billion, and other large investment projects, typically costing between $10 million and $1 billion. Projects with investments below $10 million also may be included here, either as parts of larger projects, or in case of major international significance and media coverage. In case of projects involving new vehicle models, the cost of development is taken into account as well as the cost of production.

Transportation

Air transport

Land transport

Rail transport

Planned communities

Public investments and infrastructure

Education

Water infrastructure

 Philippine Arena; (2014) Cost: $214 million (done)
 The Gramercy Residences (2012); Cost: $120 million (done)
 SMX Convention Center (2007); Cost: $20 million (done)
 Centennial Tower (never constructed); Cost: $200 million
 Makati Parking Building; (2007) Cost: $52.8 million (done)
  Entertainment City Manila (2007); Cost: $15 billion (under construction)
 ELJ Communications Center (2000); Cost: $146.7 million (done)
 PBCom Tower (2000); Cost: $74 million (done)

Power plants

 Philippine LNG Import Facility (2021); Cost: $2 billion (approved)
 Calatagan Solar Farm (2016); Cost: $120 million (done)
 Cadiz Solar Power Plant (2016); Cost: $200 million (done)
 Mariveles Coal-Fired Power Plant (2016); Cost: $1.2 billion (done)
 Bangui Wind Farm (2015); Cost: $54 million (done)
 Caparispisan Wind Farm (2015); Cost: $220 million (done)
 Mindoro Wind Farm (2014); Cost: $120 million (done)
 Burgos Windfarm (2014); Cost: $320 million (done)
 San Roque Dam (2003); Cost: $1.19 billion (done)
 Malampaya gas field (2001); Cost $4.5 billion (done)
 Bataan Nuclear Power Plant (1984); Cost: $2.3 billion; (completed but never fueled)
 Magat Dam (1982); Cost: $3.4 billion (done)
 Pantabangan Dam (1977); Cost: $20.74 million (done)
 Angat Dam (1967); Cost: $82 million (done)
 Ambuklao Dam (1956); Cost: $66 million (done)

References

Economy of the Philippines
Infrastructure in the Philippines